Radha Krishna Jagarlamudi (born 11 November 1978), better known as Krish Jagarlamudi or Krish, is an Indian film director and screenwriter who works predominantly in Telugu cinema in addition to Hindi and Tamil films. He has earned numerous accolades throughout his career including a National Film Award and two Filmfare Awards South.

Krish began his career in 2008 with the road film Gamyam and followed it up with the hyperlink film Vedam in 2010, both of which gained critical acclaim and big accolades. In 2015, he helmed the period war drama Kanche set in Nazi Germany, which won the National Film Award for Best Feature Film in Telugu.

His other notable films include Vaanam (2011), Krishnam Vande Jagadgurum (2012), Gabbar Is Back (2015), Gautamiputra Satakarni (2017) and Manikarnika: The Queen of Jhansi (2019). In 2019, he also directed the back-to-back filmed biographical dramas NTR: Mahanayakudu and NTR: Kathanayakudu and in 2020 he started filming a historical fiction movie of an outlaw Hari Hara Veera Mallu with Pawan Kalyan

Early life
Krish Jagarlamudi was born on 11 November 1978 in Guntur, Andhra Pradesh, India. He completed his higher education in the U. S. in pharmacy and computer science and worked there, before returning to India to pursue a full time career in the film industry.

Career
In 2008, Krish Jagarlamudi made his debut with Gamyam, starring Allari Naresh, Sharwanand, and Kamalinee Mukherjee. The film was produced by his father Jagarlamudi Saibaba along with his brother-in-law Bibo Srinivas, and his friend Rajeev Reddy who came forward after Krish vainly tried to convince many notable Telugu film producers. The film went on to become a big hit at the box office, and won several awards, including the Best Picture and Best Director awards at the 2009 South Filmfare Award. 

Krish's next film, Vedam (2010) is anthology starring Allu Arjun, Anushka Shetty and Manoj Manchu. It was well received by both critics and the audience, winning four major awards at the 58th Filmfare Awards South, with Krish receiving his second Filmfare Award for Best Director. Vedam was also the second film to win all the four major awards (Best Movie, Best Director for Krish, Best Actor for Allu Arjun and Best Actress for Anushka Shetty), after Jeevana Jyothi in 1975 and had a good run at the box office as well.

Following the success of Vedam, Krish was signed on to direct its Tamil remake, titled Vaanam, starring Silambarasan Rajendar, Bharath, and Anushka Shetty, reprising her role. Like its original version, Vaanam too released to critical acclaim. His next film is Krishnam Vande Jagadgurum (2012) starring Rana Daggubati and Nayantara. Krish made his Hindi debut film with Gabbar Is Back (2015). It stars Akshay Kumar, Kareena Kapoor and Shruti Haasan. 

His World war II war directorial starring Varun Tej named Kanche, released on 22 October, on the occasion of Dasara. It received positive reviews from critics and was successful at the box office. Kanche was selected for the Indiwood Panorama Competition section at the 2nd edition of Indiwood Carnival 2016 in Hyderabad. He next directed Nandamuri Balakrishna's 100th film, Gautamiputra Satakarni (2017), based on emperor Gautamiputra Satakarni. The film was commercially successful. 

Krish, next started directing Manikarnika: The Queen of Jhansi, then after with the personal request of Nandamuri Balakrishna, Krish collaborated with Balakrishna once again for the NTR duology, based on the life of N. T. Rama Rao. Both the parts, NTR: Kathanayakudu and NTR: Mahanayakudu, were critical and commercial failures.

Filmography

Film

Cameo appearances 
 Gamyam (2008) as a naxalite
 Kadhalna Summa Illai (2009) as a naxalite
 Vedam (2010) as a sadhu
 Vaanam (2011) as a sadhu
Mahanati (2018) as K. V. Reddy
NTR: Kathanayakudu (2019) as K. V. Reddy

Television

Awards and nominations 
List of awards and nominations received by Krish.

CineMAA Awards

Filmfare Awards South 

IIFA Utsavam 

Nandi Awards

National Film Awards

Producers Guild Film Awards 

South Indian International Movie Awards

TSR – TV9 National Film Awards

Zee Cine Awards Telugu

References

External links
 Interview with Radhakrishna Jagarlamudi, 06-07-2008
 Interview - Frankly with TNR 12-01-2017

Telugu film directors
Living people
Filmfare Awards South winners
Nandi Award winners
Zee Cine Awards Telugu winners
Tamil film directors
21st-century Indian film directors
Film directors from Andhra Pradesh
Hindi-language film directors
1978 births
People from Guntur
Telugu male actors
Male actors in Telugu cinema
Indian male film actors
21st-century Indian male actors
Indian screenwriters
Telugu screenwriters
Screenwriters from Andhra Pradesh